Kuribayashi is a Japanese surname. Notable people with the surname include:

 Ema Kuribayashi (born 1983), cricketer
, Japanese racewalker
 Minami Kuribayashi (born 1976), singer-songwriter
, Japanese women's basketball player
 Satoshi Kuribayashi (栗林 慧 born 1939), photographer
 Tadamichi Kuribayashi (栗林 忠道, 1891–1945), general in the Imperial Japanese Army

See also
 Kurabayashi
 Ritsurin Garden (栗林公園, Ritsurin Kōen, lit. chestnut grove garden) one of the most famous historical gardens in Japan

Japanese-language surnames